Ruth García García (born 26 March 1987) is a Spanish former footballer who played as a defender. She previously played for Barcelona and Levante UD. She has won the 2004 U19 Euro, three Leagues and six national Cups. She has taken part in the qualifiers of 2009 Euro, 2011 World Cup and 2013 Euro as well as being part of Spain national teams at the UEFA Women's Euro 2013 in Sweden and the 2015 FIFA Women's World Cup in Canada.

Club career
García joined Levante as a 17-year-old in 2004 and progressed to become an important part of the team which won the Copa de la Reina in 2005 and 2007. Levante also won the 2007–08 Superliga Femenina, earning García participation in the 2008–09 UEFA Women's Cup.

In July 2013, club captain García departed Levante after nine seasons and was immediately linked with a move to champions FC Barcelona.

At the end of the 2019–2020 season, García made the decision to retire and joined the front offices of the Levante UD organization.

International career
García is a veteran of Spain's 2004 UEFA Women's Under-19 Championship title win and their subsequent 2004 FIFA U-19 Women's World Championship campaign. She appeared for the senior Spain women's national football team in a 2–2 home draw with Finland on 15 February 2005.

In June 2013, national team coach Ignacio Quereda confirmed García as a member of his 23-player squad for the UEFA Women's Euro 2013 finals in Sweden.

Ruth was also called to be part of the squad at the 2015 FIFA Women's World Cup in Canada.

International goals

Honours

Club
 Levante UD
 Primera División (1): 2007–08
 Copa de la Reina de Fútbol (2): 2005, 2007

 FC Barcelona
 Primera División (2): 2013–14, 2014–15
 Copa de la Reina de Fútbol (3): 2014, 2017, 2018

International
 Spain
 UEFA Women's Under-19 Championship (1): 2004

Personal life
She is graduated with a Bachelor of Physiotherapy.

References

External links
 
 
 Profile at FC Barcelona
 Profile at Levante UD
 
 

1987 births
Living people
Footballers from Valencia (city)
Spanish women's footballers
Spain women's international footballers
Primera División (women) players
FC Barcelona Femení players
Levante UD Femenino players
Women's association football defenders
2015 FIFA Women's World Cup players
Spain women's youth international footballers